Xue Juan (born February 10, 1986) is a Chinese javelin thrower.

She won the silver medal at the 2002 Asian Championships, the gold medal at the 2003 World Youth Championships and finished sixth at the 2006 Asian Games. She also competed at the 2004 Olympic Games and the 2005 World Championships without reaching the finals.

Her personal best throw is 62.93 metres, first achieved in October 2003 in Changsha. This is the current junior world record. The Chinese record is currently held by Li Lei with 63.69 metres.

References

External links

1986 births
Living people
Athletes (track and field) at the 2004 Summer Olympics
Chinese female javelin throwers
Olympic athletes of China
Asian Games medalists in athletics (track and field)
Athletes (track and field) at the 2006 Asian Games
Athletes (track and field) at the 2010 Asian Games
Asian Games silver medalists for China
Medalists at the 2010 Asian Games
21st-century Chinese women